The 1892 United States presidential election in Colorado took place on November 8, 1892. All contemporary 44 states were part of the 1892 United States presidential election. Colorado voters chose four electors to the Electoral College, which selected the president and vice president.

Background
In its early days as a state, Colorado had, like the Plains States to its east, been solidly Republican. Despite widespread criticism of the national party for its monetary policy, the Republicans continuously controlled the legislature and held the governorship for five of seven terms. . Because Colorado was the leading silver-producing state in the nation, the policies of the federal government since President Hayes were deeply unpopular with both silver miners and mineowners. Crises emerging in Colorado's agricultural sector from low wheat prices and a severe drought in 1888 and 1889, combined with the state's underdevelopment to produce resentment of the Northeast, where the Republican Party's power base was located.

The Populist Party's platform called for replacing the gold standard with the free coinage of silver at a 16:1 ratio with gold. This meant that outside the Hispanic south-central counties and some parts of the eastern High Plains, support for the Populist movement was extremely strong in the state, even among many conservatives who opposed the Populists’ economic philosophy but were concerned primarily about the silver issue. In order to achieve success, the newly formed Populist Party would fuse with the minority Democratic Party, although a proposed slate of electors pledged to national Democratic nominees Grover Cleveland and Adlai Stevenson I was not withdrawn with the instruction to support the Populist nominee James B. Weaver until the last week before the poll, after a long struggle within the state Democratic Party.

Vote
Polls on election day said Weaver was two-to-one on to carry Colorado, and in the end Weaver and running mate James G. Field carried the state by 15.94 points over the Republican nominees, incumbent President Benjamin Harrison of Indiana and his running mate Whitelaw Reid of New York. Weaver dominated most of the state, especially the high mountains and West Slope.

Colorado was one of a handful of states, five in total, that did not feature former and future President Grover Cleveland on their ballots.

As of the 2020 U.S. presidential election, this is the only time Colorado voted for a third-party candidate.

Results

Results by county

Notes

References

Colorado
1892
1892 Colorado elections